Michael Ryan Harris (born October 3, 1991) is an American soccer player.  He is best known for his flip-throw.

Career

College and Amateur
Harris spent his entire college career at the University of Washington.  He made a total of 76 appearances for the Huskies and tallied four goals and 19 assists.

He also played in the Premier Development League for Washington Crossfire and Seattle Sounders FC U-23.

Professional
On January 27, 2015, Harris signed a professional contract with USL club Oklahoma City Energy FC.  He made his professional debut on March 28 in a 1–1 draw against Tulsa Roughnecks FC.

References

External links
Energy FC bio
Washington Huskies bio

1991 births
Living people
American soccer players
Washington Huskies men's soccer players
Washington Crossfire players
Seattle Sounders FC U-23 players
OKC Energy FC players
Association football defenders
Soccer players from Washington (state)
USL League Two players
USL Championship players